Rebecca Corman is an American prominent political consultant from Centre County, Pennsylvania. She is a Republican grassroots organizer for Central Pennsylvania, wife of former senator Doyle Corman and mother of senator Jake Corman.

She worked as a grassroots organizer for "just about every successful statewide Republican candidate."

PoliticsPA listed her as one of Pennsylvania's Smartest Staffers and Operatives, describing her as "[one of the best] GOP grassroots campaign organizers" as well as to the list of Pennsylvania's Most Politically Powerful Women.

References

Living people
People from Centre County, Pennsylvania
Pennsylvania political consultants
Pennsylvania Republicans
Place of birth missing (living people)
Year of birth missing (living people)